Kirsten Prout Zien (born September 28, 1990) is a Canadian actress. She is known for her lead roles in the ABC Family television shows, portraying Amanda Bloom in Kyle XY and Char Chamberlin in The Lying Game. Her first sizable break in film came in 2005, when she was cast as Abby Miller, a lead role opposite Jennifer Garner in Elektra. In 2007, Prout was nominated for Best Performance in a TV Series by the Young Artists Awards for Kyle XY. In 2010, Prout portrayed the vampire "Lucy" in Twilight Saga: Eclipse. She has guest starred in notable series including NCIS, Psych, Devious Maids, Ties That Bind and Dear White People. Prout is also known for her lead roles in the horror genre, as Alex Bell in the MTV film series My Super Psycho Sweet 16, Jewel McCaul in Joyride 3, and Sloane in the 2015 horror indie Even Lambs Have Teeth.

Early life
Prout began her acting career at the age of ten after being cast in a commercial opposite NHL superstar Wayne Gretzky. Speaking about her desire to start acting, Kirsten recalled that it was the only way she thought she could turn being a Disney Princess into a career.

Prout graduated high school from Collingwood School in West Vancouver, British Columbia, Canada, along with actors Alexander Ludwig and Mackenzie Davis.

An avid martial artist, Kirsten received a Black Belt in Taekwondo at the age of 13. That year, she was cast in Elektra, and performed her own stunts in the film.

After completing high school and the final season of Kyle XY, Prout attended McGill University, where she majored in English literature. In an interview with The Province, then 18-year-old Prout said of attending University: "I grew up on sets where I was treated like I was 25... In university you're in classes with incredibly intelligent people. You realize you're not an expert on everything."

Career
At the age of 13, Prout made her feature film debut in a lead role as Abigail "Abby" Miller in the 2005 film Elektra. The film's Producer Gary Foster said of discovering Prout: 
"We did a big search... and frankly LA or New York, we thought we'd find somebody there. She came in and auditioned and we were blown away." 
Prout has had lead roles or guest stars in 39 different film and television productions. Her most notable lead roles include Amanda Bloom in ABC Family's Kyle XY, Alex Bell in MTV's My Super Psycho Sweet 16 comedy-horror trilogy, and "Char Chamberlin" in ABC Family's The Lying Game. Her most notable guest stars include roles in Stargate SG-1, NCIS, Psych, Devious Maids, and Dear White People.

Personal life
On October 13, 2017, Prout announced her engagement to television development executive Matt Zien. They were married on November 6, 2017.

Filmography

Film

Television

Music videos 
 "Starlight" (2010) by The Framework, as Juliette

References

External links

1990 births
Canadian child actresses
Canadian expatriate actresses in the United States
Canadian film actresses
Canadian television actresses
Living people
McGill University alumni
Actresses from Vancouver
20th-century Canadian actresses
21st-century Canadian actresses
Collingwood School alumni